1909 Alekhin, provisional designation , is a stony asteroid and slow rotator from the inner regions of the asteroid belt, approximately 17 kilometers in diameter. It was discovered on 4 September 1972, by Russian–Ukrainian astronomer Lyudmila Zhuravleva at the Crimean Astrophysical Observatory, Nauchnyj, on the Crimean peninsula, and named after chess grandmaster and World Chess Champion Alexander Alekhine.

Orbit and classification 

The S-type asteroid orbits the Sun in the inner main-belt at a distance of 1.9–3.0 AU once every 3 years and 9 months (1,377 days). Its orbit has an eccentricity of 0.23 and an inclination of 2° with respect to the ecliptic.

Physical characteristics

Slow rotator 

Alekhin is a slow rotator. In March 2009 and September 2010, two rotational lightcurves for Alekhin were obtained from photometric observations made by the Palomar Transient Factory and by astronomer Roger Dymock, respectively. The lightcurves gave a rotation period of 148 hours with a brightness variation of 0.42–0.45 magnitude.

Diameter and albedo 

According to the surveys carried out by the Infrared Astronomical Satellite IRAS, the Japanese Akari satellite, and NASA's Wide-field Infrared Survey Explorer with its subsequent NEOWISE mission, Alekhin measures between 15.5 and 18.8 kilometers in diameter and its surface has an albedo of 0.046 to 0.070. The Collaborative Asteroid Lightcurve Link derives an albedo of 0.045 and a diameter of 17.3 kilometers with an absolute magnitude of 12.8.

Occultation 

Alekhin is scheduled to occlude a 9.1 magnitude star in the Leo constellation on 30 November 2008, dimming the magnitude of both heavenly bodies for a maximum duration of 0.6 seconds. Astronomers had, as of March 2008, not predicted an optimal trajectory for the event.

Naming 

This minor planet was named in honour of Russian-born Alexander Alekhine (1892–1946), chess grandmaster, considered one of the greatest chess players ever. The official  was published by the Minor Planet Center on 20 February 1976.

References

External links 
 Asteroid Lightcurve Database (LCDB), query form (info )
 Dictionary of Minor Planet Names, Google books
 Asteroids and comets rotation curves, CdR – Observatoire de Genève, Raoul Behrend
 Discovery Circumstances: Numbered Minor Planets (1)-(5000)  – Minor Planet Center
 
 

001909
Discoveries by Lyudmila Zhuravleva
Named minor planets
001909
19720904